Franz Griessbacher is an Austrian para-alpine skier. He represented Austria in alpine skiing at the 1988 Winter Paralympics.

He won the gold medal at the Men's Downhill B1 event and also at the Men's Giant Slalom B1 event.

Achievements

See also 
 List of Paralympic medalists in alpine skiing

References

External links 
 

Living people
Year of birth missing (living people)
Place of birth missing (living people)
Paralympic alpine skiers of Austria
Alpine skiers at the 1988 Winter Paralympics
Medalists at the 1988 Winter Paralympics
Paralympic gold medalists for Austria
Paralympic medalists in alpine skiing
20th-century Austrian people